Preneopogon is a genus of moths of the family Crambidae.

Species
Preneopogon barbata Warren, 1896
Preneopogon catenalis (Wileman, 1911)
Preneopogon progonialis (Hampson, 1898)

References

Natural History Museum Lepidoptera genus database

Pyraustinae
Crambidae genera
Taxa named by William Warren (entomologist)